{
 is a series of popular historical novels written by Shōtarō Ikenami and one of the representative novels of Ikenami along with Onihei Hankachō and Shikakenin Fujieda Baian. The stories were originally serialized in the Shōsetsu Shinchō between 1972 and 1989. Sixteen full-length novels were published from Shinchosha between 1973 to 1989. Kenkaku Shōbai was also adapted into TV programs and manga series.

Characters
 : Akiyama Kohei : The main character Akiyama Kohei is a master of Mugai ryu but he is spending retired life. Though Kohei is old, he is still a skilled swordsman.
  : Kohei's son who manages school of swordplay.
 : Kohei's wife. She is 40 years younger than Kohei.

Novels
  (1973)
  (1973)
  (1973)
  (1974)
  (1975)
  (1976)
  (1976)
  (1977) 
  (1978) 
  (1978)
  (1979)
  (1980)
  (1983)
  (1985)
  (1987)
  (1989)

Manga

Adaptation

Television
 Kenkaku Shōbai (1973), a Fuji TV production, Isao Yamagata as Akiyama Kohei and Gō Katō as Akiyama Daijirō.
 Kenkaku Shōbai (1998–2010) a Fuji TV production, Makoto Fujita played the role of Akiyama Kohei
 Kenkaku Shōbai (2012), a Fuji TV production, Kin'ya Kitaōji played the role of Akiyama Kohei

Manga
 Professional Swordsmen of the Edo Era (1998–1999), Illustrated by Takao Saito
 Kenkaku Shōbai (2008–2021), Illustrated by Yasuichi Oshima

References

Fictional samurai
Japanese novels
Japanese historical novels
Samurai in anime and manga
Television shows based on Japanese novels
Historical anime and manga
Jidaigeki television series
Takao Saito